Triathlon has been an event at the African Games since 2011 in Maputo, Mozambique.

Events

Medal table

Participating nations

External links

 
Sports at the African Games
All-Africa Games
All-Africa Games